Mason Jones (born 26 April 1995) is a Welsh mixed martial artist who competed in the Lightweight division of the Ultimate Fighting Championship.

Background
Mason Jones began martial arts at the age of 6, starting out with Kickboxing, before later incorporating Judo, Boxing, and Jiu-Jitsu. Mason Jones was a top 5 National Judoka and a pro boxer, who went 3-0 before making a moving into MMA. On his UFC profile, Jones says he is an avid Muay Thai and Taekwondo fighter.

Mixed martial arts career

Early career
At the age of 16, Mason Jones made his amateur MMA debut in Grapple and Strike, taking many years off before he was set again to appear in an amateur bout at 21. This was due to a series of pull-outs forcing Mason into another Amateur fight. After a series of pullouts, David Adonis stepped up to fight Mason at Cage Warriors 83, with Mason winning via Kimura.

After fighting David Adonis, Mason Jones made his pro debut. At Cage Warriors 87, Mason Jones fought Shaun Luther, where Mason was able to submit Luther with a rear-naked choke with just twelve seconds of the fight remaining.

Wales’ first Arena MMA show was Cage Warriors 97, with Mason Jones in the co-main event against Kacper Formela. Despite facing trouble early in the first, Mason was able to land his jab and started to take control of the bout, before landing a jumping knee in the latter stages of the first resulting in Mason was able to land a flurry of knees ending the bout.

For the first time, Mason Jones headlined Cage Warriors 108 on 12 October 2019 in Cardiff against Finnish Standout Aleksi Mäntykivi. Mason would control the fight, resulting in judge scores of 30-25, 30-25, 30-26.

Mason was originally booked to fight former UFC fighter Danilo Belluardo at Cage Warriors 113, however, due to travel restrictions due to the pandemic, Belluardo was unable to leave Italy and with Joe McColgan’s opponent also not being able to come into the country, they were matched against each other for the vacant Cage Warriors Lightweight Championship. During the fight, Mason had the advantage on the feet, and a flurry of knees from the Welshman once again forcing a first round stoppage.

In September 2020, Jones faced Adam Proctor at Cage Warriors 116 for the vacant Cage Warriors Welterweight Championship. With another first round stoppage win, Jones became only the second two-division champion in Cage Warriors history, second only to Conor McGregor.

Ultimate Fighting Championship
Jones made his UFC debut against faced Mike Davis at UFC on ESPN: Magny vs. Chiesa on 20 January 2021. He lost a close fight via unanimous decision. He earned a Fight of the Night bonus for his performance.

Jones faced Alan Patrick on 5 June 2021 at UFC Fight Night: Rozenstruik vs. Sakai. In the second round, after being poked in the eye accidentally by Jones, Patrick was unable to continue and the bout was declared a No Contest.

A rematch with Patrick was scheduled for 23 October 2021 at UFC Fight Night: Costa vs. Vettori. However, Patrick withdrew from bout and he was replaced by newcomer David Onama. Jones won the fight via unanimous decision.

Jones faced Ľudovít Klein, replacing Ignacio Bahamondes, on 23 July 2022 at UFC Fight Night: Blaydes vs. Aspinall. He lost the fight via unanimous decision.

In September 2022, it was reported that Jones had fought out his contract and elected not to re-sign with the organization.

Championships and accomplishments

Mixed martial arts 
 Ultimate Fighting Championship
 Fight of the Night (One time) 
 Cage Warriors
 Cage Warriors Lightweight Championship (One time; former)
 Cage Warriors Welterweight Championship (One time; former)
MMAjunkie.com
2021 January Fight of the Month vs. Mike Davis

Mixed martial arts record

|-
| Loss
|align=center| 11–2 (1)
|Ľudovít Klein
|Decision (unanimous)
|UFC Fight Night: Blaydes vs. Aspinall 
|
|align=center|3
|align=center|5:00
|London, England
|
|-
| Win
|align=center| 11–1 (1)
|David Onama
|Decision (unanimous)
|UFC Fight Night: Costa vs. Vettori
|
|align=center|3
|align=center|5:00
|Las Vegas, Nevada, United States
|
|-
| NC
| align=center| 10–1 (1)
| Alan Patrick
|NC (accidental eye poke)
|UFC Fight Night: Rozenstruik vs. Sakai
|
|align=center|2
|align=center|2:14
|Las Vegas, Nevada, United States
|
|-
| Loss
| align=center|10–1
| Mike Davis
| Decision (unanimous)
| UFC on ESPN: Chiesa vs. Magny
| 
| align=center|3
| align=center|5:00
| Abu Dhabi, United Arab Emirates
|
|-
| Win
| align=center|10–0
| Adam Proctor
| TKO (punches)
|Cage Warriors 116
|
| align=center|1
| align=center|4:31
|Manchester, England
|
|-
| Win
| align=center|9–0
| Joe McColgan
| TKO (knee and punches)
|Cage Warriors 113
|
|align=center|1
|align=center|4:14
|Manchester, England
|
|-
| Win
| align=center| 8–0
| Aleksi Mäntykivi
| Decision (unanimous)
| Cage Warriors 108
| 
|align=center| 3
|align=center| 5:00
|Cardiff, Wales
| 
|-
| Win
| align=center| 7–0
| Donovan Desmae
|Decision (unanimous)
|Cage Warriors 104
|
|align=center| 3
|align=center| 5:00
|Cardiff, Wales
|
|-
| Win
| align=center| 6–0
|Kacper Formela
|TKO (knees to the body)
|Cage Warriors 97
|
|align=center|1
|align=center|4:03
|Cardiff, Wales
|
|-
| Win
| align=center| 5–0
| Konmon Deh
| Decision (unanimous)
| Cage Warriors 95
| 
| align=center| 3
| align=center| 5:00
| London, England
|
|-
| Win
| align=center| 4–0
| Craig Edwards
|Submission (rear-naked choke)
|Cage Warriors Academy Wales 2
|
|align=center|3
|align=center|3:23
|Ebbw Vale, Wales
|
|-
| Win
| align=center|3–0
| Lawrence Tracey
|TKO (punches)
|Cage Warriors 91
|
| align=center|2
| align=center|1:41
|Newport, Wales
|
|-
| Win
| align=center| 2–0
| Brett Hassett
| Submission (kimura)
|Adrenalin Fight Nights
|
| align=center|1
| align=center|1:45
|Swansea, Wales
|
|-
| Win
| align=center|1–0
| Shaun Luther
| Submission (rear-naked choke)
|Cage Warriors 87
|
|align=center|3
|align=center|4:48
|Newport, Wales
|

See also 

 List of male mixed martial artists

References

External links 
  
 

1995 births
Living people
Welsh male mixed martial artists
Lightweight mixed martial artists
Mixed martial artists utilizing judo
Mixed martial artists utilizing boxing
Mixed martial artists utilizing kickboxing
Ultimate Fighting Championship male fighters
Welsh male judoka
Welsh male boxers